Nenad Perović may refer to:
 Nenad Perović (footballer, born 1993)
 Nenad Perović (footballer, born 2002)